Studley Football Club is a football club based in Studley, near Redditch, Warwickshire, England.

History
Studley FC was formed in 1971, playing Sunday football in the local Redditch league, they were known in those days as B.K.L.. The side was made up mainly of employees of BKL Fittings.

The club was re-launched as Studley Football Club on 2 June 2002, following the collapse of the company BKL. Further developments are planned for the future.

They have reached the first qualifying round of the FA Cup twice, in seasons 2003–04 and 2008–09.

The club was crowned champions of the Hellenic League Division One for the 2021–22 season.

Ground

The Beehive is situated in Abbeyfields Drive, which is off the main Birmingham – Alcester Road (A435).  Recent years have seen a lot  of improvements take place at The Beehive, the changing rooms have been given a complete face-lift, and for the first time ever, a snack bar is open on match days. Average attendance in home league matches at the Beehive is about 100.

In August 2020, National League club Solihull Moors started using the site as their training ground having made significant investment into the facility as part of a long-term partnership with Studley.

Honours
 1987–88 – Challenge Vase Winners
 1990–91 – Smedley Crooke Cup Winners
 1991–92 – Midland Combination Division One Champions
 1991–92 – Smedley Crooke Cup Winners
 1994–95 – Smedley Crooke Cup Winners
 1999–2000 – Smedley Crooke Cup Winners
 2000–01 – Worcester Senior Urn Winners
 2000–01 – Midland Combination Premier Division Runners-Up
 2001–02 – Tony Allden Memorial Cup Winners
 2001–02 – Worcester Senior Urn Winners
 2002–03 – Worcester Senior Urn Winners
 2008–09 – Worcester Senior Urn Winners
 2021–22 – Hellenic League Division One title

References

External links
 Studley FC home page
 Studley FC records

 
Midland Football Alliance
Association football clubs established in 1971
Football clubs in Warwickshire
1971 establishments in England
Midland Football League
Football clubs in England
Hellenic Football League
Works association football teams in England